The 1953–54 British Home Championship was an international football tournament played between the British Home Nations during the 1953–54 season. This season's tournament also doubled as UEFA – Group 3 for 1954 FIFA World Cup qualification. England dominated the Championship, winning all three games and taking first place. After defeating Ireland, Scotland struggled against Wales before losing to England. Meanwhile, Ireland defeated Wales in Wrexham to clinch third place. England, together with second-placed Scotland, subsequently qualified for the 1954 FIFA World Cup.

Results

Table
<onlyinclude>

Ireland vs Scotland

Wales vs England

Scotland vs Wales

England vs Ireland

Wales vs Ireland

Scotland vs England

England won the championship and along with Scotland they represented Great Britain in 1954 FIFA World Cup

Squads and Stats

Head coach:  Walter Winterbottom

Head coach:  Andy Beattie

Head coach:  Peter Doherty

Head coach:

References

1951
1953–54 in Northern Ireland association football
1953–54 in English football
1953–54 in Scottish football
1953–54 in Welsh football
1954 in British sport
1953 in British sport
3
England at the 1954 FIFA World Cup
Qualification group